The Mesker Brothers Iron Works and George L. Mesker & Co. were competing manufacturers and designers of ornamental sheet-metal facades and cast iron storefront components from the 1880s through the mid-twentieth century.  The Mesker Brothers Iron Works was based in St. Louis, Missouri, and was operated by brothers Bernard and Frank Mesker.  The George L. Mesker Company was operated by a third brother, George L. Mesker, and was based in Evansville, Indiana.  The Mesker brothers were the sons of John Mesker who operated a stove business in Evansville and later galvanized iron for buildings.  The three brothers learned their iron-working skills from their father.

The companies' products are often referred to as "Meskers."  The companies also produced tin ceilings, iron railings, stairs, roof cresting, ventilation grates, iron awnings, skylights, and freight elevators.

The Meskers marketed their products through catalogs displaying their designs.  The catalogs were so successful they expanded print runs from 50,000 to 500,000 one year later.  According to a 1915 catalog, there were Mesker storefronts in every state, including 4,130 in Indiana, 2,915 in Illinois, 2,646 in Kentucky, and even 17 in the territory of Alaska.

A number of their works are listed on the National Register of Historic Places.

Works by the Meskers include:
T.J. Abbott Building, Golconda, Illinois
Buster Meat Market, Main Ave. Challis, Idaho (Mesker Bros.), NRHP-listed
One or more works in Corydon Historic District (Boundary Increase), Roughly bounded by Summit, Maple & Walnut Sts., College Ave., Chestnut, Capitol, Poplar, Water, Beaver & Mulberry Sts. Corydon, Indiana (Mesker, George L. & Co.), NRHP-listed
One or more works in Edinburgh Commercial Historic District, roughly bounded by Thompson and Main Sts., the alley N of Main Cross St. and the Conrail RR tracks Edinburgh, Indiana (George L. Mesker & Co.), NRHP-listed
J. T. Ferguson Store, 11 E. Main St. Wilkesboro, North Carolina (Mesker Bros. Front Builders), NRHP-listed
Goedert Meat Market, 322 Main St. McGregor, Iowa (Mesker Bros.), NRHP-listed
Gunning–Purves Building, 311 Main Street, Friendship, Wisconsin (George L. Mesker & Co.), NRHP-listed
Hopkinton Supply Co. Building, 26-28 Main St. Hopkinton, Massachusetts (Mesker, George L.), NRHP-listed
Hotel Mann, Virginia, Illinois (Mesker Bros. Iron Works)
Joseph Jackson Hotel, 2420 S. Main St. Vallonia, Indiana (Mesker. George and Co.), NRHP-listed
One or more works in Jellico Commercial Historic District, roughly along North and South Main Sts. Jellico, Tennessee (Mesker, George), NRHP-listed
Jones, J. W. Jones Building, 104 Main St., NE Blackfoot, Idaho (Mesker, Marcus), NRHP-listed
Len Jus Building (Mason City, Iowa)
One or more works in Morgantown Historic District, Approx. 4.5 blocks centered on Washington St., bet. Marion St. and E of Church St. Morgantown, Indiana (Mesker, George L. & Co.), NRHP-listed
One or more works in Mount Vernon Commercial District, Main St. from Church to Richmond Sts. *Mount Vernon, KY (George L. Mesker & Co.), NRHP-listed
One or more works in North Vernon Downtown Historic District, bounded by Sixth and Chestnut Sts., Keller St., Fourth and Main, and Jennings North Vernon, Indiana (George L. Mesker & Company), NRHP-listed
Morris Roberts Store, Off U.S. 30 Hagerman, Idaho (Mesker Bros.), NRHP-listed
J.C. Schmohl Building, Galena, Illinois
Vollmer Building, Walnut St. Genesee, Idaho (Mesker Bros.), NRHP-listed
Josephine White Block, 737-739 Cranston St. Providence, Rhode Island (Mesker Bros.), NRHP-listed
Wilkesboro-Smithey Hotel, Broad and E. Main Sts. Wilkesboro, North Carolina (Mesker Bros. Front Builders), NRHP-listed
York Dispatch Newspaper Offices, 15 and 17 E. Philadelphia St. York, Pennsylvania (George L. Mesker), NRHP-listed
Grainfield Opera House, Grainfield, Kansas, NRHP-listed
Masonic Hall, 632 Main St, Alamosa, Colorado (Mesker & Bro.)

Their work features identically in the History of South Dakota, the History of North Dakota, the History of Montana, and the History of Nebraska.

References

History of St. Louis
Manufacturing companies based in St. Louis